The 2010 WNBA season is the 12th season for the Minnesota Lynx of the Women's National Basketball Association.

Transactions

Dispersal draft
Based on the Lynx's 2009 record, they would pick 2nd in the Sacramento Monarchs dispersal draft. The Lynx picked Rebekkah Brunson.

WNBA Draft
The following are the Lynx's selections in the 2010 WNBA Draft.

Transaction log
January 30, 2009: The Lynx traded their second round pick in the 2010 Draft to the Washington Mystics as part of the Lindsey Harding transaction.
January 12: The Lynx traded Renee Montgomery and the first overall pick in the 2010 Draft to the Connecticut Sun in exchange for Lindsay Whalen and the second overall pick in the 2010 Draft.
February 8: The Lynx re-signed free agent Seimone Augustus.
February 16: The Lynx withdrew its qualifying offer to Tasha Humphrey, making her an unrestricted free agent.
February 17: The Lynx signed free agent Hamchetou Maiga-Ba.
February 19: The Lynx signed and traded Roneeka Hodges to the San Antonio Silver Stars in exchange for the right to swap second round picks with San Antonio in the 2011 WNBA Draft.
April 8: The Lynx traded the draft rights to Kelsey Griffin to the Connecticut Sun in exchange for their first- and second-round draft picks in the 2011 Draft.
April 20: The Lynx signed Nuria Martinez.
April 22: The Lynx signed Ashley Ellis-Milan, Brittany McCoy, Vanessa Gidden and Jessica Adair to training camp contracts.
May 12: The Lynx waived Jessica Adair, Ashley Ellis-Milan, Vanessa Gidden and Brittany McCoy.
May 24: The Lynx activated Rebekkah Brunson and waived Gabriela Marginean.
July 26: The Lynx traded Rashanda McCants to the Tulsa Shock in exchange for Alexis Hornbuckle.
August 3: The Lynx waived Nuria Martinez and signed Kristen Mann.
August 18: The Lynx signed Jessica Adair and suspended Nicky Anosike.

Trades

Free agents

Additions

Subtractions

Roster

Depth

Season standings

Schedule

Preseason

|- align="center" bgcolor="ffbbbb"
| 1 || April 30 || 1:00pm || Chicago || 78-87 || Wright (18) || Marginean (9) || Wright (4) || Concordia University  633 || 0-1
|- align="center" bgcolor="ffbbbb"
| 2 || May 6 || 12:30pm || @ Chicago || 65-74 || Wright (18) || Wright (6) || Whalen (10) || Allstate Arena  N/A || 0-2
|-

Regular season

|- align="center" bgcolor="bbffbb"
| 1 || May 15 || 8:00pm || @ Tulsa || NBATVCOX || 80-74 || Houston (21) || Anosike (9) || Whalen (6) || BOK Center  7,806 || 1-0
|- align="center" bgcolor="ffbbbb"
| 2 || May 16 || 7:00pm || Washington || FS-N || 76-87 || Houston (19) || 5 players (5) || Whalen (7) || Target Center  9,985 || 1-1
|- align="center" bgcolor="ffbbbb"
| 3 || May 19 || 10:00pm || @ Seattle || KING || 76-79 || Wright (19) || Anosike (10) || Maiga-Ba (4) || KeyArena  6,687 || 1-2
|- align="center" bgcolor="ffbbbb"
| 4 || May 23 || 7:00pm || Tulsa ||  || 82-94 || Houston (23) || Anosike, Houston (9) || Maiga-Ba, Whalen (4) || Target Center  6,822 || 1-3
|- align="center" bgcolor="ffbbbb"
| 5 || May 27 || 7:30pm || @ Connecticut ||  || 79-105 || Houston, McCants (16) || Anosike, McCants (7) || Anosike (5) || Mohegan Sun Arena  6,401 || 1-4
|- align="center" bgcolor="ffbbbb"
| 6 || May 29 || 8:00pm || Chicago || CN100 || 58-73 || Houston, McCants (12) || Brunson (9) || Houston (3) || Target Center  6,129 || 1-5
|-

|- align="center" bgcolor="bbffbb"
| 7 || June 1 || 7:30pm || Phoenix || ESPN2 || 92-82 || Wright (32) || Brunson (15) || Anosike, Whalen (5) || Target Center  6,854 || 2-5
|- align="center" bgcolor="ffbbbb"
| 8 || June 4 || 8:00pm || @ Tulsa || FS-OK || 79-92 || Brunson (23) || Brunson (11) || Anosike, Whalen (5) || BOK Center  4,521 || 2-6
|- align="center" bgcolor="ffbbbb"
| 9 || June 6 || 7:00pm || Indiana || FS-N || 51-89 || Wiggins (11) || Brunson (12) || Anosike, Wiggins (3) || Target Center  6,444 || 2-7
|- align="center" bgcolor="ffbbbb"
| 10 || June 10 || 10:00pm || @ Phoenix || FS-A || 88-99 || Wright (21) || Brunson (12) || Whalen (6) || US Airways Center  5,506 || 2-8
|- align="center" bgcolor="ffbbbb"
| 11 || June 13 || 3:00pm || @ Los Angeles ||  || 84-88 || Houston (21) || Brunson (15) || Whalen (7) || STAPLES Center  7,005 || 2-9
|- align="center" bgcolor="bbffbb"
| 12 || June 18 || 8:00pm || Tulsa ||  || 78-67 || Augustus (27) || Anosike (9) || Whalen (12) || Target Center  6,953 || 3-9
|- align="center" bgcolor="bbffbb"
| 13 || June 19 || 8:00pm || @ Tulsa || COX || 92-78 || Wiggins (19) || Brunson (11) || Whalen (6) || BOK Center  5,013 || 4-9
|- align="center" bgcolor="bbffbb"
| 14 || June 22 || 7:30pm || @ New York ||  || 75-68 || Brunson (21) || Brunson (13) || Maiga-Ba, Whalen (4) || Madison Square Garden  7,537 || 5-9
|- align="center" bgcolor="ffbbbb"
| 15 || June 26 || 8:00pm || @ San Antonio || NBATVFS-SW || 66-80 || Augustus (14) || Brunson (9) || Whalen (4) || AT&T Center  10,184 || 5-10
|-

|- align="center" bgcolor="ffbbbb"
| 16 || July 1 || 7:00pm || @ Atlanta || SSO || 58-76 || Augustus (17) || Anosike (7) || Maiga-Ba, Whalen (2) || Philips Arena  4,020 || 5-11
|- align="center" bgcolor="bbffbb"
| 17 || July 8 || 8:00pm || San Antonio ||  || 89-66 || Brunson (24) || Brunson (10) || Whalen (5) || Target Center  7,182 || 6-11
|- align="center" bgcolor="bbffbb"
| 18 || July 14 || 1:00pm || Atlanta ||  || 83-81 || Augustus (22) || Brunson (9) || Whalen (7) || Target Center  12,311 || 7-11
|- align="center" bgcolor="ffbbbb"
| 19 || July 17 || 3:30pm || Seattle ||  || 71-73 || Brunson (19) || Brunson (9) || Whalen (6) || Target Center  7,216 || 7-12
|- align="center" bgcolor="ffbbbb"
| 20 || July 22 || 8:00pm || San Antonio ||  || 72-74 || Augustus (22) || Brunson (14) || Whalen (8) || Target Center  6,126 || 7-13
|- align="center" bgcolor="ffbbbb"
| 21 || July 24 || 8:00pm || Phoenix || NBATVFS-N || 124-127 (2OT) || Augustus (36) || Brunson (17) || Whalen (10) || Target Center  8,518 || 7-14
|- align="center" bgcolor="ffbbbb"
| 22 || July 27 || 8:00pm || Los Angeles ||  || 58-71 || Whalen, Wright (12) || Brunson (11) || Wright (4) || Target Center  6,215 || 7-15
|- align="center" bgcolor="ffbbbb"
| 23 || July 29 || 10:00pm || @ Phoenix ||  || 92-110 || Houston (26) || Houston (13) || Whalen (4) || US Airways Center  7,037 || 7-16
|-

|- align="center" bgcolor="bbffbb"
| 24 || August 1 || 7:00pm || Seattle || NBATVFS-N || 72-71 || Augustus (24) || Brunson (8) || Whalen (7) || Target Center  7,312 || 8-16
|- align="center" bgcolor="bbffbb"
| 25 || August 3 || 8:00pm || Connecticut || CSN-NE || 111-103 (OT) || Whalen (27) || Anosike (12) || Whalen (12) || Target Center  5,954 || 9-16
|- align="center" bgcolor="bbffbb"
| 26 || August 7 || 3:00pm || @ Chicago || ESPN2 || 87-82 (OT) || Augustus (27) || Anosike, Whalen (7) || Whalen (7) || Allstate Arena  4,992 || 10-16
|- align="center" bgcolor="ffbbbb"
| 27 || August 8 || 7:00pm || New York || NBATVFS-N || 72-74 || Whalen (18) || Brunson (18) || Whalen, Wright (3) || Target Center  9,016 || 10-17
|- align="center" bgcolor="bbffbb"
| 28 || August 10 || 8:00pm || @ San Antonio ||  || 73-66 || Augustus (20) || Brunson (12) || Hornbuckle, Whalen (4) || AT&T Center  5,142 || 11-17
|- align="center" bgcolor="ffbbbb"
| 29 || August 12 || 8:00pm || Los Angeles ||  || 77-78 || Houston (24) || Brunson (14) || Houston, Wright (3) || Target Center  7,867 || 11-18
|- align="center" bgcolor="ffbbbb"
| 30 || August 13 || 7:00pm || @ Washington ||  || 58-61 || Whalen, Wright (13) || Brunson (10) || Whalen (5) || Verizon Center  7,752 || 11-19
|- align="center" bgcolor="bbffbb"
| 31 || August 15 || 7:00pm || San Antonio || NBATVFS-NFS-SW || 84-78 || Whalen (21) || Brunson, Houston (8) || Whalen (12) || Target Center  8,678 || 12-19
|- align="center" bgcolor="ffbbbb"
| 32 || August 17 || 10:00pm || @ Seattle ||  || 64-68 || Whalen (20) || Houston (9) || Whalen (5) || KeyArena  7,394 || 12-20
|- align="center" bgcolor="ffbbbb"
| 33 || August 20 || 10:30pm || @ Los Angeles ||  || 91-98 || Houston (21) || Brunson, Houston (7) || Whalen (7) || STAPLES Center  13,154 || 12-21
|- align="center" bgcolor="bbffbb"
| 34 || August 22 || 5:00pm || @ Indiana || NBATVFS-I || 83-79 (OT) || Augustus (25) || Wright (7) || Houston (4) || Conseco Fieldhouse  10,015 || 13-21
|-

| All games are viewable on WNBA LiveAccess

Statistics

Regular season

Awards and honors
Seimone Augustus was named WNBA Western Conference Player of the Week for the week of June 12, 2010.
Lindsay Whalen was named WNBA Western Conference Player of the Week for the week of July 31, 2010.
Rebekkah Brunson was named to the 2010 WNBA All-Star Team as a WNBA reserve.
Lindsay Whalen was named to the 2010 WNBA All-Star Team as a WNBA reserve.
Monica Wright was named to the All-Rookie Team.
Rebekkah Brunson was named to the All-Defensive Second Team.

References

External links

Minnesota Lynx seasons
Minnesota
Minnesota Lynx